Carson City may refer to:

Places in the United States
Carson City, Nevada, the capital of the state
Carson City, Michigan
Carson, California
Carson City and Indian Village, a defunct amusement park in Catskill, New York

Other uses
Carson City (1952 film)
USS Carson City, two ships of the U.S. Navy

See also